The 2015 European Race Walking Cup took place on May 17, 2015. The races were held on a 1 km lap on Gran Vía Escultor Salzillo in Murcia, Spain.  Detailed reports of the event were given for the IAAF and for the EAA.

Complete results were published.

Later, Russian athletes Mikhail Ryzhov (winner of 50 km) and Ivan Noskov (runner-up of 50 km event) were disqualified for doping, and the medals were redistubuted.

Medallists

Race results

Men's 20km

~ Lost contact > Bent knee

Note: Athletes in parentheses did not score for the team result.

Men's 50km

~ Lost contact > Bent knee

Note: Athletes in parentheses did not score for the team result.

Men's 10km Junior (U20)

~ Lost contact > Bent knee

Note: Athletes in parentheses did not score for the team result.

Women's 20km

~ Lost contact > Bent knee

Note: Athletes in parentheses did not score for the team result.

Women's 10km Junior (U20)

~ Lost contact > Bent knee

Note: Athletes in parentheses did not score for the team result.

Medal table (unofficial)

Note: Totals include both individual and team medals, with medals in the team competition counting as one medal.

Participation
According to an unofficial count, 207 athletes from 27 countries participated.

References

External links
 Official website
 2015 Statistics Handbook

Videos
 Video impression of the Murcia 2015 European Cup Race Walking
 Interview: Miguel Angel Lopez 20km men Race Walking
 Interview: Matej Toth 20km men Race Walking
 Interview: Yohan Diniz 20km men Race Walking
 Interview: Marco de Luca 50km Men Race Walking
 Interview: Eleonora Giorgi 20km Women Race Walking
 Interview: Anezka Drahotova 20km Women Race Walking
 Interview: Diego Garcia 10km Junior Men Race Walking
 Interview: Pablo Oliva 10km Junior Men Race Walking
 Interview: Callum Wilkinson 10km Junior Men Race Walking
 Interview: Maria Perez 10km women junior Race Walking

European Race Walking Cup
European Race Walking Cup
Cross
European Race Walking Cup
Sport in Murcia